Golnar Abivardi and Haleh Abivardi, also known as Abivardi Sisters, are Swiss dentists and entrepreneurs, known for their chain of dental clinics called Swiss Smile.

Early life and education 
Their father was a natural scientist at ETH Zurich and their mother was the director of a school for the English language. Moving within the country, they started working different side jobs as teenagers, receiving their Matura in Zürich. Both studied dentistry at the University of Zurich; Haleh Abivardi from 1990 to 1996, finishing her dissertation in 1998,  and her younger sister Golnar from 1993 to 1998, finishing hers in 2001.

Career 
After working as employed dentists, Haleh Abivardi, the older sibling, took over a dental practice in Amriswil in 2001, opening the Abivardi & Abivardi practice with her younger sister. In 2002, they founded Swiss Smile with its first clinic at the ShopVille shopping mall at Zürich Central Station. The business idea is inspired by the mall itself, featuring f. e. long opening hours.

In 2017 the Swiss Jacobs Holding bought a share from the Abivardi sisters and from Swedish EQT Partners that had acquired a minority interest in 2013. They exited their shareholdings in Swiss Smile and the parent company Colosseum Dental in 2020.

In August 2019, the two sisters founded vVardis AG with a registered office in Baar (Zug, Switzerland), an oral care company that includes Credentis AG (acquired in 2020) and its portfolio of oral care technologies.

Personal life 
Haleh Abivardi has four children and is married. Golnar is the mother of two children and also married.

Recognition and philanthropy 
Besides being engaged in charity organisations offering free dental care for people in need, both Abivardi sisters received the Veuve Clicquot Businesswoman of the Year award for Switzerland in 2007. In addition, CNBC Magazine described their approach in 2007 as revolutionary.

References 

1969 births
1973 births
Living people
Swiss dentists
University of Zurich alumni